John William Hobbs "Doc" Pollard (February 22, 1872 – May 2, 1957) was an American football player and coach of football, basketball, and baseball.  He served as the head football coach at Union College in Schenectady, New York, from 1897 to 1899, at Lehigh University in 1901, at the University of Rochester from 1902 to 1904, at the University of Alabama from 1906 to 1909, and at Washington and Lee University from 1910 to 1911, compiling a career college football record of 56–43–8.  Pollard also coached baseball at Alabama from 1907–1910 and at Washington and Lee, tallying a career college baseball mark of 86–31–1.

Early life and education
Pollard was born on February 22, 1872, in Brentwood, New Hampshire.  He graduated from Dartmouth College in 1895 and earned an MD from the University of Vermont in 1901.

Coaching career

Union
Pollard served as the head coach at Union College in Schenectady, New York, from 1897 to 1899.

Lehigh
Pollard was the ninth head football coach for at Lehigh University in Bethlehem, Pennsylvania, and he held that position for the 1901 season. His coaching record at Lehigh was 1–11.

Alabama
Pollard was named the head football coach at the University of Alabama where he stayed from 1906 until the end of the 1909 season. He found more success at Alabama, where his teams accumulated a record of 21–4–5. Against Auburn in his first season, Pollard used a "military shift" never before seen in the south.

His success at Alabama was not without failures. The first season Pollard coached the Crimson Tide, they achieved a record of 5–1. However, that one loss was a 78–0 thrashing by Vanderbilt in Nashville, Tennessee. 1907, Pollard's second season at Alabama, was similar.  The team produced a record of 5–1–2. However, the one loss was a 54–4 pounding by Sewanee. By 1909, his team produced more consistent results. No team scored on the Crimson Tide until the last two games, and their only loss came in the last game of the season by a score of 12–6 against LSU at home.

Washington and Lee
Pollard coached at Washington and Lee University in 1911, finishing with a record of 4–2–2.

Death
Pollard died on May 2, 1957.

Head coaching record

Football

References

1872 births
1957 deaths
19th-century players of American football
Alabama Crimson Tide athletic directors
Alabama Crimson Tide baseball coaches
Alabama Crimson Tide football coaches
Basketball coaches from New Hampshire
Dartmouth Big Green football players
Lehigh Mountain Hawks football coaches
Lehigh Mountain Hawks men's basketball coaches
Rochester Yellowjackets football coaches
Rochester Yellowjackets men's basketball coaches
Union Dutchmen football coaches
Washington and Lee Generals baseball coaches
Washington and Lee Generals football coaches
Washington and Lee Generals men's basketball coaches
University of Vermont alumni
People from Brentwood, New Hampshire
Sportspeople from Rockingham County, New Hampshire
Players of American football from New Hampshire